Bahadar Kot,  west of Islamabad, is an administrative unit known as union council of Kohat District in the Khyber Pakhtunkhwa province of Pakistan.

Kohat District has two tehsils, Kohat and Lachi. Each tehsil comprises a number of union councils. There are 27 in Kohat.

See also 

 Kohat District

External links
Khyber-Pakhtunkhwa Government website section on Lower Dir
United Nations
Hajjinfo.org Uploads

Kohat District
Populated places in Kohat District
Union Councils of Kohat District